Pakim Palatine College, Pakyong is a co-educational degree College set up in 2004. It is run by the Pakim Palatine Educational Society and is affiliated to Sikkim University since July 2008.

Courses offered
The college offers wide range of courses from B.Sc, B.A Courses, B.com (Honours as well as General) etc.

Departments
The college has the following departments in the field of Arts and Science.

Honours Subjects – Chemistry, Zoology, Physics, Computer Science, Microbiology
General Subjects – Physics, Chemistry, Mathematics, Computer Science, Zoology, Botany, Microbiology, Economics, Political Science, History, Philosophy, Sociology

References

External links
https://web.archive.org/web/20130910001211/http://india.studybot.org/sikkim/pakim-palatine-college/
http://www.minglebox.com/college/Pakim-Palatine-College-Sikkim
http://www.sikkimlive.com/Pakim-Palatine-College-Pakyong-10.html

Educational institutions established in 2004
Colleges affiliated to Sikkim University
2004 establishments in Sikkim
 Pakyong district